TDAC may refer to :

 Time-domain aliasing cancellation, the underlying principle of the modified discrete cosine transform (MDCT)
 Tycho Data Analysis Consortium, that worked on the Hipparcos spacecraft astrometry data